NHS West Midlands was a strategic health authority (SHA) of the National Health Service in England.  It operated in the West Midlands region, which is coterminous with the local government office region.  It was abolished in April 2013.

General information

NHS West Midlands (also known as West Midlands Strategic Health Authority) was created in July 2006, following the merger of Birmingham and The Black Country, Shropshire and Staffordshire, and West Midlands South SHAs.

The region has a total of 46 NHS organisations: 19 hospital trusts (including nine NHS foundation trusts); six mental health trusts (including three foundation trusts); 17 primary care trusts; three community provider trusts and one ambulance services trust.

The strategic health authority was responsible for ensuring that the circa £10 billion spent on health and health care across the region delivers better services for patients and value for money for the people living in the West Midlands.

The areas encompassed by the SHA were: Birmingham, Coventry, Dudley, Herefordshire, Sandwell, Shropshire, Solihull, Staffordshire, Stoke-on-Trent, Telford and Wrekin, Walsall, Warwickshire, Wolverhampton and Worcestershire.

There are approximately 126,000 staff employed by the NHS in the West Midlands.

Full list of NHS organisations in the West Midlands

Primary care trusts

Primary care trusts were abolished in April 2013.

Birmingham East and North Primary Care Trust
NHS Coventry (Coventry Teaching PCT)
Dudley PCT
Heart of Birmingham Teaching PCT
Herefordshire PCT
NHS North Staffordshire (North Staffordshire PCT)
Sandwell PCT
Shropshire County PCT
Solihull PCT
NHS South Birmingham (South Birmingham PCT)
South Staffordshire PCT
Stoke On Trent PCT
Telford and Wrekin PCT
NHS Walsall (Walsall Teaching PCT)
NHS Warwickshire (Warwickshire PCT)
Wolverhampton City PCT
NHS Worcestershire (Worcestershire PCT)

Community provider organisations

Birmingham Community Healthcare NHS Foundation Trust
Shropshire Community Health NHS Trust
Worcestershire Health and Care NHS Trust

Acute trusts

Birmingham Children's NHS Foundation Trust
Birmingham Women's NHS Foundation Trust
Burton Hospitals NHS Foundation Trust
The Dudley Group NHS Foundation Trust
George Eliot Hospital NHS Trust
Heart of England NHS Foundation Trust
Wye Valley NHS Trust
Mid Staffordshire NHS Foundation Trust
Robert Jones and Agnes Hunt Orthopaedic Hospital NHS Trust
The Royal Orthopaedic Hospital NHS Foundation Trust
The Royal Wolverhampton Hospitals NHS Trust
Sandwell and West Birmingham Hospitals NHS Trust
Shrewsbury and Telford Hospital NHS Trust
South Warwickshire NHS Foundation Trust
University Hospital Birmingham NHS Foundation Trust
University Hospital of North Staffordshire NHS Trust
University Hospitals Coventry & Warwickshire NHS Trust
Walsall Healthcare NHS Trust
Worcestershire Acute Hospitals NHS Trust

Mental health trusts

Birmingham and Solihull Mental Health NHS Foundation Trust
Coventry and Warwickshire Partnership NHS Trust
Dudley and Walsall Mental Health Partnership NHS Trust
North Staffordshire Combined Healthcare NHS Trust
Black Country Partnership NHS Foundation Trust
South Staffordshire and Shropshire Healthcare NHS Foundation Trust

Ambulance trusts

West Midlands Ambulance Service NHS Foundation Trust

West Midlands
2006 establishments in England
2013 disestablishments in England
West Midlands (region)